Edith Surreal is the ring name of an American professional wrestler formerly known as Still Life with Apricots and Pears until 2021. She is perhaps best known for her tenure in Chikara. She currently works for various independent professional wrestling promotions such as Game Changer Wrestling, Beyond Wrestling, and Camp Leapfrog.

Professional wrestling career
Surreal began training for professional wrestling in 2017 with Chikara in her hometown of Philadelphia, Pennsylvania. There, she was trained by Drew Gulak, Ophidian, Hallowicked, Orange Cassidy, Chuck Taylor, and Cheeseburger. She made her professional wrestling debut as Still Life with Apricots and Pears at Hour Of Power 13 on February 24, 2018, where she teamed up with Ursa Minor In The Night Sky as The Nouveau Aesthetic to defeat Nytenhawk and Razerhawk. Surreal was the fifteenth holder of the Chikara Young Lions Cup after defeating Boomer Hatfield at the Young Lions Cup XV - 2nd Stage event on March 16, 2019. She worked her last match for Chikara at the National Pro Wrestling Day show on February 8, 2020 in a losing effort to Ophidian before the promotion's dissolution later that year.

After changing her name to Edith Surreal, she began working with promotions including Beyond Wrestling, Game Changer Wrestling, Enjoy Wrestling, and Camp Leapfrog. Pro Wrestling Illustrated ranked Surreal no. 192 in the top 500 singles wrestlers of 2021.

Personal life
Surreal came out as transgender in 2020 and has stated that she has faced exclusion due to this. She previously identified as non-binary, and uses she/her pronouns.

Championships and accomplishments
Camp Leapfrog
Christmas Trios (2020) — with Boomer Hatfield and Molly McCoy
Chikara
Chikara Young Lions Cup (1 time)
Independent Wrestling TV
Cassandro Cup (2021)
	Invictus Pro Wrestling
Invictus Women's Championship (1 time, current) 
Lucha Libre and Laughs
LLL Women's Championship (1 time, current)
 Pro Wrestling Illustrated
 Ranked No. 192 of the top 500 singles wrestlers in the PWI 500 in 2021
 Ranked No. 140 of the top 150 female wrestlers in the PWI 500 in 2021

Luchas de Apuestas record

References

External links 
Official website 

Professional wrestlers from Pennsylvania
LGBT people from Pennsylvania
American LGBT entertainers
LGBT professional wrestlers
American LGBT sportspeople
Transgender sportswomen
Transgender women
Living people
Year of birth missing (living people)
American female professional wrestlers